Wang Jian, also known as Wang Chien, is a female Chinese former international table tennis player.

Table tennis career
She won two bronze medals at the 1961 World Table Tennis Championships in the women's doubles with Hu Keming and women's singles. Two years later she won two more bronze medals at the 1963 World Table Tennis Championships in the Corbillon Cup (women's team) and women's doubles with Qiu Zhonghui.

See also
 List of table tennis players
 List of World Table Tennis Championships medalists

References

Chinese female table tennis players
Table tennis players from Beijing
Living people
Year of birth missing (living people)
World Table Tennis Championships medalists